Germán Larrea Mota-Velasco (born 1953/1954) is a Mexican billionaire businessman. He is the CEO of Grupo México, Mexico's largest mining corporation, and the third largest copper producer in the world. As of July 2022, his net worth was estimated at US$24.6 billion.

Career
Larrea Mota-Velasco has been chairman, president and CEO of Grupo Mexico since 1994. He was previously executive vice chairman of Grupo Mexico and has been a director since 1981.

He has served as chairman of the Southern Copper Corporation since December 1999, CEO from December 1999 to October 2004, and as a director since November 1999. He has been chairman and CEO of Grupo Ferroviario Mexicano since 1997. He has been chairman and CEO of Empresarios Industriales de Mexico, Compania Perforadora Mexico, Mexico Compania Constructora, and Fondo Inmobiliario since 1992.

He founded Grupo Impresa, a printing and publishing company in 1978, remaining as the chairman and CEO until 1989, when the company was sold. He is also a director of Banco Nacional de Mexico, which forms part of Grupo Financiero Banamex, Consejo Mexicano de Hombres de Negocios, and Grupo Televisa.

According to Forbes, in February 2020 he is worth US$14.3 billion, and the second richest man in Mexico, after Carlos Slim.

In November 2020, Larrea Mota-Velasco sold 100,000 shares in Southern Copper Corporation for a total price of $6 million, meaning he now owns a stake in the company worth almost $121 million.

Personal life
Larrea Mota-Velasco is married, and lives in Mexico City. He owns and breeds Thoroughbreds under the nom de course of St. George Stable. His mare Letruska became the first horse that had raced in Mexico to subsequently win at the Grade I level in the United States when she won the Apple Blossom Handicap in 2021.

References 

1950s births
Living people
Mexican billionaires
Mexican company founders
Businesspeople from Mexico City
Mexican transportation businesspeople
Mexican mining businesspeople
People named in the Pandora Papers